Michaelshaffera is a genus of snout moths. It was described by Maria Alma Solis in 1998.

Species
 Michaelshaffera beckeri Solis, 1998
 Michaelshaffera maidoa (Schaus, 1922)

References

Chrysauginae
Pyralidae genera